Dirty Girl or Dirty Girls or The Dirty Girls may refer to:

 Dirty Girl (2008 film), a 2008 film starring Monica Ramon
 Dirty Girl (2010 film), a 2010 film directed by Abe Sylvia
 "Dirty Girls", an episode of the television series Buffy the Vampire Slayer
 The Dirty Girls, a 1965 film directed by Radley Metzger
 "Dirty Girl" (song), a 2007 single by Terri Clark from her unreleased album My Next Life
 "Dirty Girl", a song by Eels from their 2003 album Shootenanny!
 "Dirty Girl", a song by Rob Mills
 Dirty Girl, an open-pollinated variety of the tomato 'Early Girl'